Love Locked Out is a solo album by jazz pianist Chris Anderson which was recorded in 1987 and released on the Mapleshade label in 1990.

Reception

The AllMusic site awarded the album 4 stars stating "Anderson's breezy noodling on standards, his own poignant originals, and overall aggressiveness were passed on to many prized pupils, as well as Hancock; now, the teacher gets some credit".

Track listing
All compositions by Chris Anderson except where noted.
 "Where or When" (Richard Rodgers, Lorenz Hart) - 9:01
 "Detour Ahead" (Herb Ellis, Johnny Frigo, Lou Carter) - 5:30 		
 "So Blue" - 7:03
 "Love Locked Out" (Ray Noble, Max Kester) - 5:02
 "Send in the Clowns" (Stephen Sondheim) - 6:55
 "The Folks Who Live on the Hill" (Jerome Kern, Oscar Hammerstein II) - 6:06
 "For Seana" - 6:52
 "Sandy's Song" - 5:50
 "Love Letters" (Victor Young, Edward Heyman) - 5:31

Personnel
Chris Anderson – piano, vocals

References

1990 albums
Chris Anderson (pianist) albums
Mapleshade Records albums
Solo piano jazz albums